Alan Goodman runs branding and communications for, and is a founder of, TESTD Inc., a company that builds health and wellness data management products for providers, individuals, enterprises, and municipalities. He is a former American media executive, writer, and television producer who has worked in media since 1981.

Early life and education
Goodman began his media career while still in high school as a reporter at The Hunterdon County Democrat in Flemington, New Jersey. When entering Columbia University in 1970, he joined the college radio station, WKCR-FM where he first encountered his future collaborators, Albie Hecht and Fred Seibert.

Cable television
In 1981, Goodman was part of the team that launched MTV: Music Television, alongside his college radio alum Fred Seibert. Goodman supervised hundreds of animations and their accompanying soundtracks depicting the MTV trademark designed by Manhattan Design.

Seibert and Goodman resigned from MTV and started their company "Fred/Alan" in New York. Together, they consulted with MTV's sister channel, Nickelodeon, which was having challenges finding audiences for their quality kids programming. They led the efforts to rebrand the network as "The First Kids' Network" and help build its new vocabulary, promotional strategies and execution to get the word out the America's cable homes.

Fred/Alan were MTV Networks' advertising agency, conceiving and creating Nick-at-Nite and launching VH-1.

Goodman worked with MTV Networks, the parent company of both MTV and Nickelodeon, for over 30 years.

Writing and production

There are few mediums that Goodman hasn't written for over the years including newspapers, radio, television, advertising, jazz record liner notes and digital.

He created or co-created the television series Kids' Court, The Movie Masters (both with Albie Hecht) Hey Dude, The Mystery Files of Shelby Woo, among others. Goodman co-created the Nickelodeon Kids' Choice Awards. Goodman wrote scripts for several television shows including Hey Dude, Clarissa Explains It All, Clifford's Puppy Days and JoJo's Circus. He was the co-producer and show runner for two seasons of Clarissa Explains It All.

Since 1984 Goodman has been the primary writer and creative director for the all the brochure and website essays for one of the most respected jazz reissue record labels, Mosaic Records limited edition jazz boxes. This work is in addition to his liner note writing for various independent jazz recording labels.

During his consulting engagement at BBC America, Goodman wrote and produced entertainment news content and specials for the network. He was also one of the developers and first creative director at COZI-TV, a free-to-air television network owned by the NBC Owned Television Stations division of NBCUniversal. At COZI-TV he also wrote, directed, and produced original content, including the first ever fully auto-tuned TV program, "Autotune The Munsters."   

Goodman has written two books -- "A Slash in the Night," the first in a series of novels based on characters in Goodman's Nickelodeon series "The Mystery Files of Shelby Woo,"  and "The Big Help Book."  He also was a contributor to "The Rolling Stone Record Guide."  Goodman was a co-creator of the Virgin Comics (now Liquid Comics) title, "The Econauts."

References

External links
The MTV Logo

Living people
American advertising executives
American consulting businesspeople
American television producers
American television writers
American male voice actors
American male television writers
MTV executives
Nickelodeon executives
American voice directors
1953 births
Columbia College (New York) alumni